Mass media in Chennai
Companies based in Tirunelveli
Companies based in Tamil Nadu
Tamil-language newspapers published in India
Newspapers published in Chennai
Evening newspapers published in India
Mass media in Coimbatore
Thanthi Group
Publications with year of establishment missing